Gert Sibande (until 2004 known as the Eastvaal District Municipality) is one of the 3 districts of Mpumalanga province of South Africa. The seat of Gert Sibande is Ermelo. The majority of its 900 007 people speak IsiZulu (2001 Census). The district code is DC30. On 15 October 2004, the municipality changed its name from the "Eastvaal" (Afrikaans: Oosvaal) to "Gert Sibande" District Municipality. The district is named after the ANC activist Gert Sibande.

Geography

Neighbours
Gert Sibande is surrounded by:
 Nkangala to the north (DC31)
 Ehlanzeni to the north-east (DC32)
 The kingdom of Eswatini to the east
 Zululand to the south-east (DC26)
 Amajuba to the south (DC25)
 Thabo Mofutsanyane to the south-west (DC19)
 Fezile Dabi to the south-west(DC20)
 Sedibeng to the west (DC42)

Local municipalities
The district contains the following local municipalities:

Demographics
The following statistics are from the 2001 census.

Gender

Ethnic group

Age

Politics

Election results
Election results for Gert Sibande in the South African general election, 2004. 
 Population 18 and over: 517 104 [57.46% of total population]
 Total votes: 319 593 [35.51% of total population]
 Voting % estimate: 61.80% votes as a % of population 18 and over

References

External links
 Gert Sibande DM Official Website

District municipalities of Mpumalanga
Gert Sibande District Municipality